Pissia was a town and bishopric of ancient Phrygia.

Its site is located near Piribeyli, Yunak, Turkey.

Its bishop was suffragan of Amorium.

References

Populated places in Phrygia
Former populated places in Turkey
Roman towns and cities in Turkey
Populated places of the Byzantine Empire
Former Roman Catholic dioceses in Asia
Suppressed Roman Catholic dioceses
History of Konya Province